Alan Baird Ferguson  (born 16 September 1943) is a former Australian politician who was a Liberal member of the Australian Senate representing South Australia from May 1992 to June 2011. He served as the 22nd President of the Australian Senate from August 2007 to August 2008.

Ferguson was born in Maitland, South Australia. He became a farmer, then a manager of farms, and then an insurance consultant. Before entering politics, Ferguson was educated at Weetulta Rural School and later at Scotch College in Adelaide. He was president of the South Australian Division of the Liberal Party from 1990 to 1992.

For eight years until his election as President of the Senate in 2007, Ferguson chaired the influential Joint Standing Committee on Foreign Affairs, Defence and Trade in the Australian Parliament.

Ferguson decided not to run again in the 2010 election, and his final term ended on 30 June 2011.

References

1943 births
Living people
Liberal Party of Australia members of the Parliament of Australia
Presidents of the Australian Senate
Members of the Australian Senate
Members of the Australian Senate for South Australia
Members of the Order of Australia
People from Maitland, South Australia
People educated at Scotch College, Adelaide
Delegates to the Australian Constitutional Convention 1998
20th-century Australian politicians
21st-century Australian politicians